The Ruling Class may refer to 
Ruling class, as a proper noun, the social class which controls politics and wealth
 Aristocratic class
 Political class
 Upper class
The Ruling Class (play), 1968 play by Peter Barnes
The Ruling Class (film), 1972 film adaptation of the play
The Ruling Class (novel), 2004 novel, unrelated to the play and the film
Elements of Political Science by Gaetano Mosca, published in English as The Ruling Class

See also
 Class (disambiguation)
 Elite theory